The 2005 Junior League World Series took place from August 14–20 in Taylor, Michigan, United States. Panama City, Panama defeated Tarpon Springs, Florida in the championship game.

Teams

Results

United States Pool

International Pool

Elimination Round

References

Junior League World Series
Junior League World Series